The 2021–22 season was Al-Ahli's 46th consecutive season in the top flight of Saudi football and 85th year in existence as a football club. The club will participate in the Pro League and the King Cup.

The season covers the period from 1 July 2021 to 30 June 2022.

Players

Squad information

Out on loan

Transfers and loans

Transfers in

Loans in

Transfers out

Loans out

Pre-season

Competitions

Overview

Goalscorers

Last Updated: 23 June 2022

Assists

Last Updated: 23 June 2022

Clean sheets

Last Updated: 27 June 2022

References

Al-Ahli Saudi FC seasons
Ahli